Nina Anatolievna Zyuskova (born May 3, 1952 in Kalchyk, Donetsk, Russia) is a Soviet athlete who competed mainly in the 400 metres.

She competed for the USSR in the 1980 Summer Olympics held in Moscow where she won the gold medal with her teammates Tatyana Prorochenko, Tatyana Goyshchik and Irina Nazarova in the women's 4×400 metres event. She received the Order of the Badge of Honour and is a Merited Master of Sports of the USSR.

After the Olympics, she began working as a children's coach in Donetsk, Russia.

References

1952 births
Ukrainian female sprinters
Soviet female sprinters
Olympic gold medalists for the Soviet Union
Olympic athletes of the Soviet Union
Athletes (track and field) at the 1980 Summer Olympics
Living people
Medalists at the 1980 Summer Olympics
Olympic gold medalists in athletics (track and field)
Olympic female sprinters
Sportspeople from Donetsk Oblast